John Bright (May 23, 1884 – March 24, 1948) was a United States district judge of the United States District Court for the Southern District of New York.

Education and career

Born in Middletown, Orange County, New York, Bright read law to enter the bar in 1906. He was in private practice in Middletown from 1906 to 1941, serving as corporate counsel to the City of Middletown from 1910 to 1917, and as Director of the Orange County Trust Company in 1914.

Federal judicial service

Bright was nominated by President Franklin D. Roosevelt on April 25, 1941, to the United States District Court for the Southern District of New York, to a new seat authorized by 54 Stat. 219. He was confirmed by the United States Senate on June 3, 1941, and received his commission on June 6, 1941. His service terminated on March 24, 1948, due to his death in Middletown.

References

Sources
 

1884 births
1948 deaths
Judges of the United States District Court for the Southern District of New York
United States district court judges appointed by Franklin D. Roosevelt
20th-century American judges
United States federal judges admitted to the practice of law by reading law